Mary is a 2005 drama thriller film, written and directed by American director Abel Ferrara. The film stars Juliette Binoche, Forest Whitaker, Marion Cotillard, Matthew Modine and Heather Graham.

The film premiered at the 2005 Venice Film Festival where it won the Special Jury Prize as well as 3 smaller awards. The film also played at the 2005 Toronto International Film Festival, Deauville Film Festival and San Sebastián International Film Festival.

Although co-produced by an American and French film company and shot in English and partly in the United States, the film has been little seen outside of Europe, and does not have a Region 1 DVD release. It received a limited theatrical release in America a full 3 years after premiering at the Venice Film Festival. The film has 3 European non-English language websites, but no English language website.
UK DVDs use the title Mary: This is My Blood.

Plot summary
 
Following the shooting of a film on the life of Jesus called This Is My Blood, Marie Palesi, the actress who plays Mary Magdalene takes refuge in Jerusalem in search of the truth behind the story, while the film's director, who also plays Jesus, returns to New York to aggressively promote the film.
The film within a film is drawing public controversy for reasons that are never directly specified, but some scenes in the film draw on the non-canonical Gnostic Gospels, while there are public allegations that the film is anti-Semitic for reasons that are not given.
In New York, television journalist Ted Younger (Forest Whitaker) is presenting a series of programs about the life of Jesus, and chooses to interview the film's director. Privately, Younger is having a crisis of faith.

Cast
 Forest Whitaker – Ted Younger
 Juliette Binoche – Marie Palesi/Mary Magdalene
 Matthew Modine – Tony Childress/Jesus
 Heather Graham – Elizabeth Younger
 Marion Cotillard – Gretchen Mol
 Stefania Rocca – Brenda Sax
 Francine Berting – Nurse #2
 Giovanni Capalbo – Police man
 Massimo Cortesi – Priest
 Ettore D'Alessandro – Apostle Andrew
 Alex Grazioli – Apostle Matthew
 Emanuela Iovannitti – Johanna, Mary's follower
 Marco Leonardi – Apostle Peter
 Amos Luzzatto – himself
 Thure Riefenstein – Silvanus
 Gisella Marengo – Nurse Nicu
 Mario Opinato – Apostle James
 Gabriella Wright – TV technician
 Elaine Pagels
 Jean-Yves Leloup

Reception
Upon its release Mary immediately divided critics and viewers alike, it holds a 59% rating on Rotten Tomatoes based on 17 reviews, with an average score of 5.5/10.

Positive
 "A sincere grapple with faith and redemption in cynical times." – Leslie Felperrin, Variety
 "Somehow turns confusion into a concise study on what it means to believe in God in this day and age." – Chris Cabin, Filmcritic.com
 "..both Forest Whitaker and Juliette Binoche (as with the rest of the cast) give such amazing performances that they should be added to the list of the best work of their careers." – Michael Ferraro, Film Threat

Negative
 "Ferrara presents his ideas in what's meant to be a meditation on the nature of faith but ends up an incoherent, pretentious mess." – Josh Bell, Las Vegas Weekly
 "Some critics went as far as rebaptising (excuse the pun) the director "Unable Ferrara" after the press screening here in Venice." – Boyd van Hoeij, Europeanfilms.net
 "Murky and forgettable." – Ray Bennett, The Hollywood Reporter

Soundtrack
The original soundtrack was written by Francis Kuipers.

Track listing
 "Mary (prologue)" – 1.53
 "They Took my Lord" – 6.15
 "Disciples & Discord" – 4.04
 "Street Attack" – 1.06
 "Mary in the Desert" – 3.54
 "Gnostic Gospel" – 3.29
 "Women at Sea" – 1.56
 "Sacred Heart" – 3.18
 "Among Believers" – 2.50
 "Holy Land Explosion" – 1.25
 "Madness of God" – 3.36
 "This is my Blood" – 5.43
 "Hidden Scripture" – 2.53
 "Mary (Epilogue)" – 3.35

Soundtrack credits
 Francis Kuipers – Guitar
 Miriam Butler – Bassoon
 David Barittoni – Voices
 Giulio Luciani – Viola, violin
 Roberto Bellatalla – Double Bass
 Paola Di Silvestro – Soprano
 Fabio Colucci – Music producer and mixer
Recorded at Herzog Studios, Rome (Italy)

Awards
Venice Film Festival 2005
 Grand Jury Prize
 Mimmo Rotella Foundation Award
 SIGNIS Award
 Sergio Trasatti Award

French film poster
The French poster for Mary features a woman praying at an altar. The image was taken in the Church of the Holy Sepulcher in Jerusalem. The film was the first film to be allowed film in the actual church.

References

External links
 Mary – Official French Site
 Mary – Official Polish Site
 Mary – Official Italian Site
 
 

2005 thriller drama films
2005 films
American thriller films
2000s English-language films
Films about religion
Films directed by Abel Ferrara
Films shot in Matera
2000s French-language films
2000s Hebrew-language films
Portrayals of Mary Magdalene in film
Venice Grand Jury Prize winners
2005 drama films
2005 multilingual films
2000s American films